Axel Braun (born Alessandro Re) is an Italian-American adult film producer and director known for his productions of pornographic parodies.

The son of Lasse Braun, he is an AVN Hall of Fame, XRCO Hall of Fame and NightMoves Hall of Fame inductee.

Early life
Axel was born and raised in Milan, Italy. His mother had a brief affair with adult film director Lasse Braun. Axel didn't meet Lasse until he was 14. He attended film school at Columbia College Hollywood.

Career 
Braun has directed over 500 movies since 1990. Braun's movie Batman XXX: A Porn Parody was the best-selling and best-renting title of 2010. Due to the success of Batman XXX, Vivid Entertainment created a new line to capitalize on the superhero and sci-fi genres called Vivid Superhero and Braun was named leading director for the initiative. In 2013, Braun left Vivid and signed an exclusive directing contract with Wicked Pictures to launch Wicked Fairy Tales and Wicked Comix, two imprints dedicated exclusively to fairy tale and comic book parodies. In December 2020, following the acquisition of Wicked Pictures by Gamma Entertainment, Braun was appointed Head of Production for the company.

Advocacy
Braun filed a federal lawsuit against 7,098 individuals who he alleged illegally shared digital copies of his movie Batman XXX: A Porn Parody on October 29, 2010.

In May 2014, Braun announced two new policies for his productions. First, he would no longer forgo the use of condoms in his videos. Second, he will require full-panel STD/HIV tests no older than seven days. He added that he would personally cover the cost for the test if a performer's current test is older.

Recognition 
Braun was inducted into the AVN Hall of Fame in 2011 and into the XRCO Hall of Fame in 2014. He has won the AVN Best Parody award for ten consecutive years in 2011, 2012, 2013, 2014, 2015, 2016, 2017, 2018, 2019, and 2020. Braun is the only adult director to have won the AVN Director of the Year award four consecutive times in 2011, 2012, 2013 and 2014. In January 2015, 24 XXX: An Axel Braun Parody became the first parody ever to win the AVN Movie of the Year award. Braun won the top award again in 2016 with Peter Pan XXX: An Axel Braun Parody, and in 2017 with Suicide Squad XXX: An Axel Braun Parody scoring an unprecedented AVN Movie of the Year three-peat. In 2019, Braun won the AVN Movie of the Year for a fourth time with The Possession of Mrs. Hyde, his first non-parody feature in 15 years, written with his father Lasse Braun and his son Rikki, and shot entirely in Black and White CinemaScope.

Other ventures 
Braun is the owner of Level 5 Post, a post-production company that supplies editing, authoring, graphics and special effects to many adult and mainstream companies.

Selected awards

See also 

 Porn parody

References

External links 

  
 Level 5 Post – Braun's post production company
 
 
 

Italian film directors
Living people
Italian pornographic film directors
Italian pornographic film producers
1966 births
Film people from Milan
Italian parodists
Parody film directors